is a Japanese politician of the Liberal Democratic Party (LDP), a member of the House of Representatives in the Diet (national legislature). A native of Ojika, Nagasaki and graduate of Waseda University, he ran unsuccessfully for the assembly of Nagasaki Prefecture in 1982 but became the assembly of Sasebo, Nagasaki in the following year. In 1986 he ran unsuccessfully for the House of Representatives as an independent. After having served in the assembly of Nagasaki Prefecture for four terms since 1987, he was elected to the House of Representatives for the first time in 2000 as an independent. He later joined the LDP.

He serving as the Minister of State from 11 September 2019.

References

External links 
 Official website in Japanese.

1947 births
Living people
People from Sasebo
Politicians from Nagasaki Prefecture
Waseda University alumni
Members of the House of Representatives (Japan)
Liberal Democratic Party (Japan) politicians
21st-century Japanese politicians